The 1981–82 season was the North American Soccer League's third indoor soccer season.

Overview
Thirteen of a possible 14 NASL teams participated. Fort Lauderdale was the only non-participant in the 18-game regular season. The Los Angeles Aztecs and the Minnesota Kicks had been scheduled to participate but were unable to do so, due to mounting financial issues. By early December both teams had folded. Other changes in the indoor structure included the separating of the teams into two conferences, each with two divisions. The Atlantic Conference contained the East and Central Divisions, while the Pacific Conference held the West and Northwest Divisions. During the regular season teams played eighteen matches within their conference only. Four teams from each conference advanced to the playoffs, which included the two division winners, along with the two non-division winners with the best won-loss record. The championship series was broadcast live on ESPN. The San Diego Sockers won the championship with a two-game finals sweep of the Tampa Bay Rowdies. This was the Sockers' first ever NASL title. Juli Veee of San Diego won both the regular season and playoff MVP awards.

Regular season
W = Wins, L = Losses, GB = Games behind 1st place, % = Winning percentage, GF = Goals for, GA = Goals against

Atlantic Conference

Pacific Conference

NASL All-Stars

First team

Second team

Playoffs

Bracket

1st round

If a playoff series is tied after two games, a 15 minute, tie breaker mini-game is played.

Semi-finals

#Although Edmonton was the higher seed, a scheduling conflict forced both games to be played in San Diego.

Championship finals

*Championship finals re-seeded based on regular-season won-loss record.

Championship match reports

1981–82 NASL Indoor Champions: San Diego Sockers

Postseason awards
Most Valuable Player: Juli Veee, San Diego
Playoff MVP: Juli Veee, San Diego

References

 

NASL Indoor seasons
NASL Indoor Season, 1981-82
NASL Indoor Season, 1981-82
1982